The 2011 División Profesional season (officially the 2011 Copa TIGO- Visión Banco for sponsorship reasons) was the 77th season of top-flight professional football in Paraguay.

Teams

Torneo Apertura
The Campeonato de Apertura, also the Copa TIGO -Visión Banco for sponsorship reasons, is the first championship of the season. It began on January 29 and ended on June 5.

Standings

Results

Torneo Clausura
The Campeonato de Clausura, also the Copa TIGO -Visión Banco for sponsorship reasons, is the second championship of the season. It began on July 29 and ended on December 11.

Standings

Results

Aggregate table

Relegation
Relegations is determined at the end of the season by computing an average of the number of points earned per game over the past three seasons. The two teams with the lowest average is relegated to the División Intermedia for the following season.

Top goalscorers

See also
2011 in Paraguayan football

References

External links
APF's official website 
Season rules 
2011 season on RSSSF

Para
Paraguayan Primera División seasons
1